This is a survey of the postage stamps and postal history of Zululand under British rule.

The Zulu Kingdom was defeated by Britain in the Anglo-Zulu War and was annexed as a British territory in 1887. For a brief period, it operated its own postal system and had its own postage stamps.

First post office
A Natal postal agency was established in Eshowe in 1876 (closed between 1879 and 1885), but an official postal system was not started until 1 May 1888, at which time both Zululand and neighboring Natal became members of the Universal Postal Union. At first, the territory used postage stamps of Great Britain and Natal overprinted "ZULULAND".

Key type stamps
A series of ten definitive issues in the key plate style with a profile of Queen Victoria, inscribed "ZULULAND" appeared in 1894 and were in use at 21 post offices. These stamps ranged in denomination from 1/2 penny to five pounds.

Annexation
Zululand was annexed by Natal on 31 December 1897, and separate stamps were discontinued on 30 June 1898.

Further reading 
 Davis, Tony and Hugh Joseph. The Postmarks of Zululand. Johannesburg: T. Davis, 1984, 58p.  
 Dickson, John. Bibliography of the Philately and Postal History of Natal and Zululand. Ilminster: Natal and Zululand Study Circle, 1999, 24p.
 Poole, Bertram W.H. The Postage Stamps of Zululand. London: David Field, 1909, 28p.
Proud, Ted. The Postal History of Swaziland & Zululand. Heathfield, Sussex: Postal History Publications, 1996 , 182p.
 Redgrave, W.J. Zululand. s.l.: Jungle Press, 1985, 157p.

See also
Postage stamps and postal history of Natal
Zululand
Revenue stamps of Zululand

References and sources
References

Sources
 Encyclopaedia of Postal Authorities
Rossiter, Stuart & John Flower. The Stamp Atlas. London: Macdonald, 1986. 

Philately of South Africa
Zulu Kingdom